Granastrapotherium is an extinct genus of ungulate mammals, described from remains found in rocks of the Honda Group in the Tatacoa Desert, in the Colombian departments of Huila and Tolima, at the Miocene fossil site La Venta. The only species formally recognized is Granastrapotherium snorki (from Spanish, gran, "great"; Astrapotherium, "lightning beast"; and snorkel, breathing tube, in reference to the trunk). Remains found in Bolivia and Peru, seem to belong to Granastrapotherium or a very similar animal.

Description 

This astrapothere differs from its coeval, the uruguaytheriine astrapotheriid Xenastrapotherium by their larger size, between 3 and 4 tonnes, with tusks about one meter long, making it one of the largest representatives of Astrapotheria, only surpassed by some species of Parastrapotherium. Other differences include the presence of only one premolar, the lack of incisors in both jaws and the disposition of the canine tooth, which are very large and horizontal, which reminds much less of those of hippos and more of the tusks of some ancient relatives of elephants (such as Palaeomastodon), although the defences in elephants and their relatives are not formed by the canines but the incisors. Similarly, the large nostrils appear extremely withdrawn on the skull, so this creature had to have a larger trunk than other astrapotheres. Most likely, like elephants, this animal used its muscular proboscis together with its tusks to cut leaves off trees and shrubs.

Phylogeny 
Cladogram based in the phylogenetic analysis published by Vallejo-Pareja et al., 2015, showing the position of Granastrapotherium:

References

External links 

 Website of the Berkeley University about the fauna of La Venta, including Granastrapotherium
 "Snorki the giant's friends and relatives" in the blog Tetrapod Zoology
 Information and images about Granastrapotherium in Spanish

Meridiungulata
Miocene mammals of South America
Laventan
Neogene Colombia
Fossils of Colombia
Honda Group, Colombia
Fossil taxa described in 1997
Prehistoric placental genera